() is a building in the center of Barcelona. It was designed by Antoni Gaudí, and is considered one of his masterpieces. A remodel of a previously built house, it was redesigned in 1904 by Gaudí and has been refurbished several times after that. Gaudí's assistants Domènec Sugrañes i Gras, Josep Canaleta and Joan Rubió also contributed to the renovation project.

The ground floor, in particular, has unusual tracery, irregular oval windows and flowing sculpted stone work. There are few straight lines, and much of the façade is decorated with a colorful mosaic made of broken ceramic tiles. The roof is arched and was likened to the back of a dragon or dinosaur. A common theory about the building is that the rounded feature to the left of centre, terminating at the top in a turret and cross, represents the lance of Saint George (patron saint of Catalonia, Gaudí's home), which has been plunged into the back of the dragon.

In 2005,  became an UNESCO World Heritage Site among the other Works of Antoni Gaudí, and is visited by people from around the world.

History

Initial construction (1877)

The building that is now  was built in 1877, commissioned by Lluís Sala Sánchez. It was a classical building without remarkable characteristics within the eclecticism traditional by the end of the 19th century. The building had a basement, a ground floor, four other floors and a garden in the back.

Batlló family

The house was bought by Josep Batlló in 1903. The design of the house made the home undesirable to buyers but the Batlló family decided to buy the place due to its centralized location. It was an area where the prestigious family could draw attention to themselves.

In 1906, Josep Batlló still owned the home. The Batlló family was very well known in Barcelona for its contribution to the textile industry in the city. Mr. Josep Batlló i Casanovas was a textile industrialist who owned a few factories in the city. Mr. Batlló married Amàlia Godó Belaunzarán, from the family that founded the newspaper La Vanguardia. Josep wanted an architect that would design a house that was like no other and stood out as being audacious and creative. Both Josep and his wife were open to anything and they decided not to limit Gaudí. Josep did not want his house to resemble any of the houses of the rest of the Batlló family, such as Casa Pía, built by the Josep Vilaseca. He chose the architect who had designed Park Güell because he wanted him to come up with a risky plan. The family lived on the principal floor of  until the middle of the 1950s.

Renovation (1904-1906)

In 1904, Josep Batlló hired Gaudí to design his home; at first his plans were to tear down the building and construct a completely new house. Gaudí convinced Josep that a renovation was sufficient and was also able to submit the planning application the same year. The building was completed and refurbished in 1906. He completely changed the main apartment which became the residence for the Batlló family. He expanded the central well in order to supply light to the whole building and also added new floors. In the same year the Barcelona City Council selected the house as a candidate for that year's best building award. The award was given to another architect that year despite Gaudí's design.

Refurbishments
Josep Batlló died in 1934 and the house was kept in order by the wife until her death in 1940. After the death of the two parents, the house was kept and managed by the children until 1954. In 1954, an insurance company named Seguros Iberia acquired Casa Batlló and set up offices there. In 1970, the first refurbishment occurred mainly in several of the interior rooms of the house. In 1983, the exterior balconies were restored to their original colour and a year later the exterior façade was illuminated in the ceremony of La Mercè.

Multiple uses
In 1993, the current owners of Casa Batlló bought the home and continued refurbishments throughout the whole building. Two years later, in 1995, Casa Batlló began to hire out its facilities for different events. More than 2,500 square meters of rooms within the building were rented out for many different functions. Due to the building's location and the beauty of the facilities being rented, the rooms of Casa Batlló were in very high demand and hosted many important events for the city.

Design

Overview
The local name for the building is Casa dels ossos (House of Bones), as it has a visceral, skeletal organic quality. The building looks very remarkable — like everything Gaudí designed, only identifiable as Modernisme or Art Nouveau in the broadest sense. The ground floor, in particular, is rather astonishing with tracery, irregular oval windows and flowing sculpted stone work.

It seems that the goal of the designer was to avoid straight lines completely. Much of the façade is decorated with a mosaic made of broken ceramic tiles (trencadís) that starts in shades of golden orange moving into greenish blues. The roof is arched and was likened to the back of a dragon or dinosaur. A common theory about the building is that the rounded feature to the left of centre, terminating at the top in a turret and cross, represents the lance of Saint George (patron saint of Catalonia, Gaudí's home), which has been plunged into the back of the dragon.

Loft

The loft is considered to be one of the most unusual spaces. It was formerly a service area for the tenants of the different apartments in the building which contained laundry rooms and storage areas. It is known for its simplicity of shapes and its Mediterranean influence through the use of white on the walls. It contains a series of sixty catenary arches that creates a space which represents the ribcage of an animal.  Some people believe that the “ribcage” design of the arches is a ribcage for the dragon's spine that is represented in the roof.

Noble floor and museum

The noble floor is larger than seven-hundred square meters. It is the main floor of the building. The noble floor is accessed through a private entrance hall that utilizes skylights resembling tortoise shells and vaulted walls in curving shapes. On the noble floor, there is a spacious landing with direct views to the blue tiling of the building well. On the Passeig de Gracia side is Mr. Batlló's study, a dining room, and a secluded spot for courting couples, decorated with a mushroom-shaped fireplace. The elaborate and animal-like décor continues throughout the whole noble floor.

In 2002, the house opened its doors to the public, and people were allowed to visit the noble floor. The building was opened to the public as part of the celebration of the International Year of Gaudí. Casa Batlló met with very much unanticipated success, and visitors became eager to see the rest of the house. Two years later, in celebration of the one hundredth anniversary of the beginning of work on Casa Batlló, the fifth floor was restored and the house extended its visit to the loft and the well. In 2005, Casa Batlló became a UNESCO World Heritage Site.

Roof

The roof terrace is one of the most popular features of the entire house due to its famous dragon back design. Gaudí represents an animal's spine by using tiles of different colors on one side. The roof is decorated with four chimney stacks, that are designed to prevent backdraughts.

Exterior façade

The façade has three distinct sections which are harmoniously integrated. The lower ground floor with the main floor and two first-floor galleries are contained in a structure of Montjuïc sandstone with undulating lines. The central part, which reaches the last floor, is a multicolored section with protruding balconies. The top of the building is a crown, like a huge gable, which is at the same level as the roof and helps to conceal the room where there used to be water tanks. This room is currently empty. The top displays a trim with ceramic pieces that has attracted multiple interpretations.

Roof tiles

The roof's arched profile recalls the spine of a dragon with ceramic tiles for scales, and a small triangular window towards the right of the structure simulates the eye. Legend has it that it was once possible to see the Sagrada Família through this window, which was being built simultaneously. As of 2022, the partial view of the Sagrada Família is available from this vantage point, with its spires visible over newer buildings. The tiles were given a metallic sheen to simulate the varying scales of the monster, with the color grading from green on the right side, where the head begins, to deep blue and violet in the center, to red and pink on the left side of the building.

Tower and bulb
One of the highlights of the façade is a tower topped with a cross of four arms oriented to the cardinal directions. It is a bulbous, root-like structure that evokes plant life. There is a second bulb-shaped structure similarly reminiscent of a thalamus flower, which is represented by a cross with arms that are actually buds announcing the next flowering. The tower is decorated with monograms of Jesus (JHS), Maria (M with the ducal crown) and Joseph (JHP), made of ceramic pieces that stand out golden on the green background that covers the façade. These symbols show the deep religiosity of Gaudí, who was inspired by the contemporaneous construction of his basilica to choose the theme of the holy family.

The bulb was broken when it was delivered, perhaps during transportation. Although the manufacturer committed to re-do the broken parts, Gaudí liked the aesthetic of the broken masonry and asked that the pieces be stuck to the main structure with lime mortar and held in with a brass ring.

Central section

The central part of the façade evokes the surface of a lake with water lilies, reminiscent of Monet's Nymphéas, with gentle ripples and reflections caused by the glass and ceramic mosaic. It is a great undulating surface covered with plaster fragments of colored glass discs combined with 330 rounds of polychrome pottery. The discs were designed by Gaudí and Jujol between tests during their stay in Majorca, while working on the restoration of the Cathedral of Palma.

Balcony
Finally, above the central part of the façade is a smaller balcony, also iron, with a different exterior aesthetic, closer to a local type of lily. Two iron arms were installed here to support a pulley to raise and lower furniture.

Main floor
The façade of the main floor, made entirely in sandstone, and is supported by two columns. The design is complemented by joinery windows set with multicolored stained glass. In front of the large windows, as if they were pillars that support the complex stone structure, there are six fine columns that seem to simulate the bones of a limb, with an apparent central articulation; in fact, this is a floral decoration. The rounded shapes of the gaps and the lip-like edges carved into the stone surrounding them create a semblance of a fully open mouth, for which the Casa Batlló has been nicknamed the "house of yawns". The structure repeats on the first floor and in the design of two windows at the ends forming galleries, but on the large central window there are two balconies as described above.

Gallery

See also
 List of Modernista buildings in Barcelona
 Confidant from the Batlló House

References

Bibliography

External links

Official websites
 
 Casa Batlló Store
 Official Virtual Tour

Unofficial websites
 Casa Batlló on GreatBuildings.com
 Casa Batlló pictures at barcelona-tourist-guide.com
 Casa Batlló description
 Casa Batllo at Gaudidesigner.com
 Casa Batllo at Tot Passejant (Spanish)

1877 establishments in Spain
Antoni Gaudí buildings
Art Nouveau houses
Azulejos in buildings in Catalonia
Eixample
Houses completed in 1877
Houses in Catalonia
Modernisme architecture in Barcelona
Passeig de Gràcia
Tourist attractions in Barcelona
Visionary environments
World Heritage Sites in Catalonia